Huseyn Muradov (29 June 1975 – 15 March 2014), better known by his stage name Huseyn Derya, was an award-winning Azerbaijani rapper and actor from Baku, Azerbaijan.

Early life
Darya was born on June 29, 1975, in Baku, the district of Bakikhanov.

He graduated from Baku secondary school No. 4, and accepted to Baku State University, but at the same time there was a war in Azerbaijan. He dropped out of university and joined the army. After coming back from the war, he continued his career as a musician.

On March 14, 2014, he was badly injured in a traffic accident, and died on the next day.

See also
 Azerbaijani hip hop

References

1975 births
2014 deaths
Musicians from Baku
Azerbaijani rappers